Robert George Turner (January 31, 1934 – February 7, 2005) was a Canadian professional ice hockey defenceman for the Montreal Canadiens and the Chicago Black Hawks in the NHL. He won the Stanley Cup 5 times from 1956 to 1960.

Awards and achievements
1956 Stanley Cup Championship (Montreal)
1957 Stanley Cup Championship (Montreal)
1958 Stanley Cup Championship (Montreal)
1959 Stanley Cup Championship (Montreal)
1960 Stanley Cup Championship (Montreal)
1956 NHL All-Star (Montreal)
1957 NHL All-Star (Montreal)
1958 NHL All-Star (Montreal)
1959 NHL All-Star (Montreal)
1960 NHL All-Star (Montreal)
1961 NHL All-Star (Chicago)

External links

Hockey Hall of Fame Biography

1934 births
2005 deaths
Buffalo Bisons (AHL) players
California Golden Seals
Canadian expatriate ice hockey players in the United States
Canadian ice hockey coaches
Canadian ice hockey defencemen
Chicago Blackhawks players
Ice hockey people from Saskatchewan
Montreal Canadiens players
Regina Pats coaches
Regina Pats players
Sportspeople from Regina, Saskatchewan
Stanley Cup champions